8 Heads in a Duffel Bag is a 1997 black comedy film starring Joe Pesci, Kristy Swanson and David Spade. It was the directorial debut of screenwriter Tom Schulman. In 1998 the film won the Brussels International Festival of Fantastic Film's Silver Raven award.

Plot
Tommy Spinelli (Joe Pesci) is a wiseguy hired by Benny and Rico, a pair of dimwitted hitmen, to transport a duffel bag full of severed heads across the United States to crime boss "Big Sep" (as proof of the deaths). While on a commercial flight, his bag is accidentally switched with that of Charlie Pritchett (Andy Comeau), a friendly, talkative, young American tourist who is going to Mexico to see his girlfriend Laurie (Kristy Swanson) and her parents, Dick and Annette (George Hamilton and Dyan Cannon).

Spinelli harasses Charlie's friends Ernie (David Spade) and Steve (Todd Louiso) for information, while Charlie and Laurie attempt to get rid of their rather unfortunate luggage.

After Charlie meets with Laurie and her parents at the airport with the wrong bag, they go to their rooms at the resort in Acapulco, Mexico. Soon, Annette mistakenly thinks that Charlie might be a serial killer on the run once she sees a head in his bag while hiding a gift for him inside the bag. Her husband thinks it's all a delusion brought on by her alcoholism.

At first, Charlie and Laurie try to bury the heads in the desert, but a group of thugs steals their car. Then Charlie comes up with an idea that he will give back the heads without anyone noticing, by pretending he forgot to turn in his report back at his college. In turn, everyone packs up for the airport.
At the airport, Charlie accidentally puts a severed head in Dick's carry-on bag, causing him to get arrested. They never leave Acapulco since they have to come up with a new plan to save Dick.

Meanwhile, Tommy, Ernie and Steve start to look for replacement heads, after Charlie tells Tommy he lost one. They start to look in a cryonics lab, where they store bodies and severed heads, much to Tommy's approval. After getting the replacement heads, Tommy and the others get on a plane and head to Mexico. Tommy threatens Charlie that if he loses more heads, he'll replace them with Charlie's friends and family. After hearing of the airport incident, Benny and Rico decide to collect the heads for themselves.

When Fern, Dick's mother, arrives in Mexico, Tommy takes her and the others hostage as he helps Charlie find more heads. They find out that a coyote took one of the heads from the stolen car. Tommy also realizes that Benny and Rico are going to kill him if he doesn't get the heads across the border in time. Charlie comes up with a plan to save both their lives.

Charlie and Laurie take a severed head to the airport to prove her father's innocence. Benny and Rico try to intervene, but end up getting arrested. It is revealed that Tommy and Charlie set them up. Charlie thanks him for his help, as Tommy departs to Hawaii. Steve goes insane and starts running around the airport, telling security guards that a severed head is his "best friend".

Charlie and Laurie get married, with her mother and father present, Steve is in a straitjacket, Ernie is a brain surgeon, Fern is also present after being thrown out of a moving van when she started to bad-mouth Tommy, and Tommy is enjoying his retirement.

Cast
 Joe Pesci as Tommy Spinelli
 Andy Comeau as Charlie Pritchett
 Kristy Swanson as Laurie Bennett
 George Hamilton as Dick Bennett
 Dyan Cannon as Annette Bennett
 David Spade as Ernie Lipscomb
 Todd Louiso as Steve
 Anthony Mangano as Rico
 Joe Basile as Benny
 Ernestine Mercer as Fern Bennett
 Howard George as "Big Sep"

Production
In April 1993, it was announced Tom Schulman would write an original idea for Caravan Pictures that would serve as his directorial debut.

Reception

Box office
The film was a box office disappointment, earning a total of $4 million worldwide against a production budget of $3 million.

Critical response
On Rotten Tomatoes the film holds an approval rating of 10% based on 20 reviews, with an average rating of 4/10. On Metacritic, the film has a weighted average score of 15 out of 100 based on reviews from 17 critics, indicating "overwhelming dislike". Audiences polled by CinemaScore gave the film an average grade of "C" on an A+ to F scale.

Leonard Klady of Variety wrote: "There's a germ of a very funny idea in "8 Heads in a Duffel Bag" that extends well beyond its offbeat title. But pic's amusing premise is undone by lackluster direction, a script unwilling to go the limit of its bizarre central idea and some botched casting." Klady does have some praise for the makeup work creating the severed heads from the title. Rita Kempley of The Washington Post called it "Sheer torture, the very definition of unfunniness itself."
Entertainment Weeklys Bruce Fretts gave the film a rating of 'F' and further stating that it "aims for dark farce but ends up playing more like Weekend at Bernie's VIII".

Roger Ebert of the Chicago Sun-Times gave the film two out of four stars and praised Pesci's performance, saying "he's funny every moment he's on the screen". Ebert says the film "takes a lot of chances, and if they'd all worked it might have been a great comedy".

See also
 Out of Bounds

References

External links
 
 
 

1997 films
1997 directorial debut films
1997 comedy films
1990s black comedy films
1990s crime comedy films
American black comedy films
American crime comedy films
British crime comedy films
1990s English-language films
1990s Spanish-language films
Films set in Acapulco
Films shot in New Jersey
Films shot in California
Mafia comedy films
Orion Pictures films
British black comedy films
1990s American films
1990s British films